Clay Dreslough is an American video game designer. He is the creator of the Baseball Mogul and Football Mogul computer sports games, and is the co-founder and president of Sports Mogul, Inc. He was born in Boston, Massachusetts and graduated from Wesleyan University.

Professional life
Dreslough's design and programming credits include the Tony La Russa Baseball series, Pennant Fever, Microsoft Baseball, Madden, Baseball Mogul, Baseball Mogul Online, Football Mogul, and MLB Slugfest Loaded. His production credits include NBA: Phenom and MLB: Road To The Show. According to MobyGames, Clay has more published baseball and football titles than any other member of the game industry. As a successful computer game developer and publisher, Dreslough is rare in his outspoken stance against digital rights management and other forms of copy protection.

According to MobyGames, Dreslough has been credited as a programmer, designer or video game producer on 17 computer game titles; the most recently credited one on that site being in 2013.

Baseball research
Clay Dreslough has been a member of 'SABR', the Society for American Baseball Research, since 1995. He is the first baseball researcher to invent and publish a statistic used to measure defense-independent pitching performance. His other contributions to baseball research include the SABR style manual, an article on the fluctuating effectiveness (aka "streakiness") of major league pitchers, and the creation of a 'DICE' (Defense-Independent Component ERA).

In 1999, Dreslough invented and popularized a new format for the MLB postseason. After an organized letter-writing campaign to the baseball commissioner, this format was adopted for the 2012 season.

Personal life
Dreslough created his first baseball simulation game at the age of 5. It used three six-sided dice to determine the batting results for each of 9 different types of players. In high school, Dreslough created a baseball simulation game called Pennant Race and a "sperm simulation game" entitled Emission: Impossible. Both were distributed as shareware. He also co-wrote and published One Step Beyond, a tabletop role-playing game.

His wife, Dee Dreslough, is a writer and digital artist who has released some of her works under an open license.  She is the creator of the fictional world of Dimar, featuring dragon-like creatures and their interactions with humans and other sentient species. The name Dreslough (pronounced DRESS-lock) is a unique name, created by blending the surnames Dresser and McLoughlin.

References

Living people
Wesleyan University alumni
Place of birth missing (living people)
Year of birth missing (living people)
Video game designers
American game designers